Como Dam is a dam in Ravalli County, Montana, in the far western part of the state.

Como Dam was originally constructed by local farmers around 1910, to impound a natural lake for irrigation storage; the United States Bureau of Reclamation enhanced and stabilized that structure in 1954, in 1976, and in 1992-1993. As part of the larger Bitter Root Project, the dam and reservoir are both owned by the local Bitter Root Project Irrigation District.

Recreation includes fishing, camping, and boating. The site is surrounded by the Bitterroot National Forest.

Concerns that the lack of an Early Warning System on the dam could lead to catastrophic loss of life in the Bitterroot Valley in the event of nighttime inundation led officials to take measures to ensure the safety of the dam in 2017.

References

External links

Dams in Montana
Reservoirs in Montana
United States Bureau of Reclamation dams
Buildings and structures in Ravalli County, Montana
Dams completed in 1910
Historic American Engineering Record in Montana
Landforms of Ravalli County, Montana